Visualizing Cultures is an educational website intended to tie "images and scholarly commentary in innovative ways to illuminate social and cultural history."

History
The site was created in 2002 by Professors John W. Dower of the History Faculty and Shigeru Miyagawa of Foreign Languages and Literatures. It is affiliated with the MIT open courseware project, a project initiated in 2001 intended to make materials from MIT courses available freely online. The site draws on the digitized visual record to develop historical units covering events in China, Japan, and the Philippines in the modern world. Some 28 scholars from multiple universities have collaborated with Visualizing Cultures to produce 55 units comprising essays, visual narratives, and image galleries. With the mission to explore history utilizing the newly digitized visual record, and the potential of image-driven scholarship published in the interactive digital medium and disseminated on the web, the site design and structure was developed by the project's Creative Director, Ellen Sebring. 

A “gateway to seeing history through images that once had wide circulation among peoples of different times and places" Visualizing Cultures investigates history as “how people saw themselves, how they saw others including foreigners and enemies, and how in turn others saw them.” Nine of the units have curriculum designed for secondary school teaching. Outreach of the project includes workshops for teachers and a traveling exhibition that toured the United States, including an exhibit as part of the revival of Stephen Sondheim's play, Pacific Overtures on Broadway, and Japan. Visualizing Cultures (VC)has collaborated with more than 200 museums, libraries, and archives to make the digital visual record in the form of popular, political, and commercial historical images, freely accessible under the Creative Commons license.

The project was recognized by MIT with the “Class of 1960 Innovation in Education Award" in 2004. In 2005, the National Endowment for the Humanities selected VC for inclusion on “EDSITEment” as an online resource for education in the humanities. The curriculum on the website for the Canton Trade unit won the 2011 "Franklin R. Buchanan prize from the Association of Asian Studies for best curricular materials concerning Asia." The first Visualizing Cultures unit, “Black Ships & Samurai,” written by John Dower, juxtaposed the visual record from the two sides of the 1853-1854 encounter when Commodore Matthew Perry of the United States arrived in Japan aboard steam-powered gunboats to force that long-secluded country to open its borders to the outside world.

2006 Controversy

On April 23, 2006, the MIT homepage posted a link to the Visualizing Cultures project in its “Spotlight” section. 

The "Throwing Off Asia" units included some woodblock prints produced in Japan as propaganda during the Chinese-Japanese War of 1894–1895. One of the prints illustrated Japanese soldiers executing "violent Chinese soldiers," with human heads scattered on the ground and blood gushing from the captives' necks. 

A campus-based Chinese student-led protest ensued, saying that the purpose of the project was not sufficiently clear to contextualize the negative messages of the historical images on the site. The protest led to general concerns over academic freedom and the right to student protest. The website was temporarily taken down in response to the criticism.

H-Asia, an international history and online discussion forum of scholars and teachers in the Humanities & Social Sciences, published a section on the controversy, and exchanges between Chinese and Japanese researchers ignited a debate upon how it should be handled. Other articles on it included Benjamin A. Elman's "Teaching through the MIT Visualizing Cultures Controversy in Spring 2006".  After a week, the authors agreed to include additional context to the sections before republishing their work. The website is currently online.

In 2015, Duke University published a journal article, 'Reconsidering MIT Visualizing Cultures Controversy,' edited by Winnie Wong and Jing Wang, on the debate seen in the larger critical context, is coming out from Positions: Asia Critique, Vol. 23, No. 1 (2015).  The special issue reflects upon the student protest and public controversy over the Massachusetts Institute of Technology (MIT) Visualizing Cultures website in 2006 from multiple perspectives. Three sets of questions raised by the incident are addressed by contributors to the volume. The first entails questions over the changing narratives of nationalism and history in Sino-Japanese-US relations, and as taught to and contested by Chinese overseas students. The second revolves around the use and display of visual images in pedagogical, digital, and scholarly contexts, examining debates over authority and interpretation of propagandistic, racist, and violent visual imagery. The third stems from the promises of digital media and examines the challenges of public participation and dissent in the pedagogical sphere. In what ways should or could the norms of scholarship, pedagogy, and student interaction evolve in response to the digital turn, to the globalization of the student body, and to the appropriation of visual technology in the classroom?

References

External links
Website home page
麻省理工问题版画遭中国学生抗议 教授道歉
麻省理工刊登日军国主义版画当事人提出道歉
Jing Wang on the MIT Controversy over “Visualizing Cultures”Response1
Jing Wang on the MIT Controversy over “Visualizing Cultures”Response2
Jing Wang on the MIT Controversy over “Visualizing Cultures”Response3
 Peter C. Perdue's Open Letter to Chinese Students at MIT

2002 establishments in Massachusetts
History websites of the United States
Massachusetts Institute of Technology